Beautiful Days is a 2018 South Korean drama film starring Lee Na-young, Jang Dong-yoon and Oh Kwang-rok. The film premiered as the opening film of the 23rd edition of the Busan International Film Festival on October 4, 2018. It was released in theaters on November 21, 2018.

Plot
The film follows the life of a North Korean defector who gives birth to a son at a young age and abandons her husband and child for a better life abroad. The hidden past is revealed after fourteen years when the grown-up son visits her.

Cast
Lee Na-young as Mother
Jang Dong-yoon as Zhen Chen
Oh Kwang-rok as Zhen Chen's father
Lee Yoo-jun as Pimp 
Seo Hyun-woo 
Lee Jung-joon

Production 
Beautiful Days is director Jéro Yun's debut feature film and lead actress Lee Na-young's first film in 5 years.

The film began production on October 31, 2017. Filming wrapped on November 26, 2017.

Reception
In Variety,  Peter Debruge says, "Lee Na-young impresses as a North Korean woman tracked down by her long-since-abandoned son". Reviewing it for Screendaily, Wendy Ide noted the film as being structurally a little over-complicated, but still is an impressive drama which feels convincingly rooted in real lives and stories.

Clarence Tsui of The Hollywood Reporter writes, "Beautiful Days certainly lives up to its title with its mesmerizing imagery and very polished production values. But it is weighed down by a clichéd narrative and simplistic moral binaries".

References

External links

 

2018 films
2018 drama films
South Korean drama films
2018 directorial debut films
Films about North Korean defectors
2010s South Korean films